James Thomas McLaughlin (1860–1895) was professional baseball player. He played part of the 1884 season in Major League Baseball Baltimore Orioles, appearing in three games as a pitcher and three as an outfielder.

External links

Major League Baseball pitchers
Major League Baseball outfielders
Baltimore Orioles (AA) players
Toledo Blue Stockings (minor league) players
Portsmouth Riversides players
Frankfort (minor league baseball) players
Binghamton Crickets (1880s) players
Omaha Omahogs players
Sioux City Corn Huskers players
Baseball players from Ohio
19th-century baseball players
1860 births
1895 deaths